St. Monance railway station served the village of St Monans, Fife, Scotland from 1863 to 1965 on the Fife Coast Railway.

History 

Its name was changed to St Monans in October 1875 but changed back to St Monance in February 1936.

A camping coach was positioned here by the Scottish Region from 1954 to 1963 and two coaches from 1956 to 1958, in the final year a Pullman camping coach was used.

The station closed to passengers on 6 September 1965. The line closed to goods traffic on 18 July 1966.

References

Bibliography

External links 

Disused railway stations in Fife
Former North British Railway stations
Railway stations in Great Britain opened in 1863
Railway stations in Great Britain closed in 1965
1863 establishments in Scotland
1965 disestablishments in Scotland
Beeching closures in Scotland
St Monans